Liometopum pallidum is an extinct species of Miocene ant in the genus Liometopum. Described by Heer in 1867, the fossils were found in Croatia.

References

†
Miocene insects
Prehistoric insects of Europe
Fossil taxa described in 1867
Fossil ant taxa